The Sikorsky S-42 was a commercial flying boat designed and built by Sikorsky Aircraft to meet requirements for a long-range flying boat laid out by Pan American World Airways (Pan Am) in 1931. The innovative design included wing flaps, variable-pitch propellers, and a tail-carrying full-length hull. The prototype first flew on 29 March 1934, and, in the period of development and test flying that followed, quickly established ten world records for payload-to-height. The "Flying Clipper" and the "Pan Am Clipper" were other names for the S-42.

Design and development

During the inaugural flight of Sikorsky's previous flying boat, the S-40, on November 19, 1931, the pilot and Pan American Airways consultant, Charles Lindbergh, who considered the S-40 a monstrosity, engaged designer Igor Sikorsky in a conversation about what he thought the next airplane should look like. The conversation continued that night at the hotel in Jamaica. Sikorsky argued that design development should be incremental and that the safe approach would be a larger S-40. Lindbergh argued that a sleeker design, with a range in still air of 2,500 miles, was needed.

In June 1931 Pan Am president Juan Trippe had requested designs from six aircraft companies for an aircraft able to span the oceans. The new design would need increased lifting capacity to carry enough fuel and 300 pounds of mail, but no passengers, for a 2,500-mile (4,023-kilometer) nonstop flight against a 30 mph (48 km/h) wind, at a higher cruising speed than the norm for similar flying boats at that time. Of the six companies tenders had been sent to, only Sikorsky and Martin provided submissions. Sikorsky offered the S-42. The other offer was the more ambitious Martin M-130.

The new Sikorsky design, the S-42, had major aerodynamic improvements over the S-40. Igor Sikorsky said, "in its very outline the S-42 represents simplicity. Diverting sharply from the past Sikorsky designs, external bracings have been reduced to a minimum. The tail, instead of being supported by outriggers, is attached directly to the hull." The S-42 had a high wing loading which required flaps to provide acceptable takeoff and landing speeds. Though Lindbergh approved of the S-42, it fell far short of his proposed range. Stripped of all accommodations, with extra fuel tanks in the fuselage, the S-42 was just able to fly proving flights across the Atlantic and Pacific oceans. Pan Am would have to wait for the Martin M-130 to have an airliner capable of flying the Pacific with a payload.

Pan Am's S-42s were used primarily on the Miami - Rio de Janeiro route. In 1937 S-42s also operated a New York-to-Bermuda service. 1940 saw S-42 flights between Seattle and Alaska. An S-42 was also used between Manila and Hong Kong.
 
British Marine Aircraft Ltd. was formed in February 1936 to produce S-42A flying boats under license in the United Kingdom but nothing came of this. The company built a factory on the western side of the Hamble peninsula with a slipway to Southampton Water. When the deal fell through, the company was sold to Henry Folland, who renamed it Folland Aircraft Limited.

Operational history

Flying for Pan American Airways, a total of ten S-42s were built, manufactured by the Vought-Sikorsky Aircraft Division of the United Aircraft Corporation in Stratford, Connecticut. The prototype first flew on March 30, 1934.

Pan American was the sole customer for the S-42. The S-42 Pan Am Clipper surveyed the route from the US West Coast to China, making the first survey flight from Alameda, California to Pearl Harbor, Hawaii in April 1935. 

According to Sikorsky, "Later on, another Pan American S-42 inaugurated the longest over ocean airline in the world from San Francisco to New Zealand. Finally in July, 1937, another S-42 Clipper made the first regular airline crossing of the North Atlantic Ocean starting from the United States, flying first to England by the northern route, and then to Portugal by the Bermuda-Azores route.

In March 1939 a Pan Am S-42 was scheduled to leave Miami at 0730, stop overnight in San Juan, Port of Spain, Belem and Recife, and arrive at Rio de Janeiro at 1530 on the fifth day. (It returned to Miami, and passengers to Buenos Aires continued on DC2/DC3s.)

In early 1942 the U.S. Navy acquired one S-42 which it used as a transport in the Caribbean and to South America.

All Sikorsky S-42s were either scrapped or destroyed in crashes.

In 1947, inventor Lemuel Stewart purchased the fuselage of S-42 NC-822M Brazilian Clipper from Pan Am for $750.00, converted it to a six-room houseboat, and kept it docked in a boat canal in Miami, Florida. Its ultimate fate is unknown.

Variants
S-42
Production aircraft with four 700 hp (522 kW) Pratt & Whitney Hornet S5D1G radial engines, three built: NC 822M, NC 823M, NC 824M.
S-42A
Production aircraft with four 750 hp (559 kW) Pratt & Whitney Hornet S1EG radial engines, longer wings and a 2,000 lb (907 kg) increase in maximum takeoff weight, four built: NC 15373, NC 15374, NC 15375, NC 15376.
S-42B
Production aircraft with aerodynamic improvements, constant-speed Hamilton Standard propellers and a further 2,000 lb (907 kg) increase in maximum takeoff weight, three built: NC 16734, NC 16735, NC 16736.
British Marine BM-1
Proposed licence-built variant of the S-42A, not built.

Notable accidents and incidents

On April 11, 1936, a Pan Am S-42 crashed on takeoff from Port of Spain, Trinidad & Tobago, killing three of 25 on board. The pilot swerved to avoid a fishing boat that was in his path but one pontoon struck the boat and the aircraft overturned.

On January 11, 1938, Pan Am Flight 1, an S-42B named Samoan Clipper (formerly Pan American Clipper II), exploded near Pago Pago, American Samoa. The flying boat developed an engine problem shortly after takeoff. The pilot elected to dump fuel before making an emergency landing, but the aircraft exploded while fuel dumping was in progress. All seven crew members (including famous aviator Captain Ed Musick), died in the crash.

On October 3, 1941, Pam Am Flight 203, an S-42A named Dominican Clipper, crashed on landing in the harbour at San Juan, Puerto Rico, killing two of 27 on board. After the approach to San Juan, the aircraft hit the water in a nose-low attitude while moving sideways; after the first contact the aircraft swerved violently to the right and broke apart.

On December 8, 1941, a Pan Am S-42B named Hong Kong Clipper II (formerly Bermuda Clipper and Alaska Clipper) was destroyed on the water at Kai Tak Airport, Hong Kong, during a Japanese bombing raid.

On July 27, 1943, a Pan Am S-42B named Bermuda Clipper (formerly Pan American Clipper III) caught fire and burned while docked at Manaus; there was no one on board.

On August 8, 1944, Pan Am Flight 218, an S-42 named Hong Kong Clipper (formerly West Indies Clipper and Pan Am Clipper I) on a return trip from San Juan to Miami with intermediate stops at Port-au-Prince and Antilla, Cuba, crashed shortly after taking off from Antilla. After striking, bow first, the flying boat left the water in a slightly nose-high attitude, then returned, and by the third time, stalled. There were 17 fatalities (all passengers) out of the 26 passengers and five crew.

Specifications (S-42)

See also

References
Notes

Bibliography

 Davies, R.E.G. Pan Am: An Airline and its Aircraft.  New York: Orion Books, 1987. .
 Yenne, Bill. Seaplanes & Flying Boats: A Timeless Collection from Aviation's Golden Age. New York: BCL Press, 2003. .

External links

 Sikorsky S-42 photos and history
 Sikorsky S-42
 "Atlantic Routine," Flight 1937,  contemporary article on S42 and British Caledonian operating across Atlantic
 "The Long-Range Flying Boat, Its Development and Characteristics: A Precis of a Lecture Delivered by Igor Sikorsky,"  in Flight, 1934 article on the S-42 design
 "Thirty-Two Passenger Flying Boat Meets First Tests," Popular Science Monthly, June 1934, article bottom of p. 37
 "Giant Plane to Cut U.S. - Argentine Time" Popular Mechanics, October 1934, cutaway drawings of purposed S-42, pp. 488–489
 "Sikorsky Sees Dawn to Dusk Trans-Atlantic Flight by Airliners" Popular Mechanics, January 1935, pp. 44-46
 "Pan Americans Flying Boat the Sikorsky S-42", YouTube 3.33 minutes, excellent rare photos of S-42 in service

S-042
1930s United States airliners
Flying boats
Four-engined tractor aircraft
Parasol-wing aircraft
Pan Am
Aircraft first flown in 1934
Four-engined piston aircraft